Yakau Zenko (born 21 July 2000) is a Belarusian retired figure skater. He competed in the final segment at the 2016 World Junior Championships.

Career 
Zenko began learning to skate in 2004. Early in his career, he trained under Julia Soldatova at Moskvich in Moscow.

By the 2015–2016 season, he had joined Eteri Tutberidze and Sergei Dudakov at Sambo 70 (Moscow). Making his ISU Junior Grand Prix (JGP) debut, he placed 16th in Austria and 8th in Poland, both held in September 2015. A few months later, he became the Belarusian national senior bronze medalist and junior champion. In March 2016, he qualified to the final segment at the World Junior Championships in Debrecen, Hungary; he ranked 22nd in the short program, 15th in the free skate, and 17th overall.

Zenko was eliminated after the short program at the 2017 World Junior Championships in Taipei, Taiwan. He was coached by Tutberidze and Dudakov.

In the 2017–2018 season, Zenko is coached by Igor Rolinski in Moscow and Minsk.

Programs

Competitive highlights 
CS: Challenger Series; JGP: Junior Grand Prix

References

External links 
 

2000 births
Belarusian expatriate sportspeople in Russia
Belarusian male single skaters
Living people
Figure skaters from Minsk
21st-century Belarusian people